Suman Haripriya (born 1 June 1979) is an Indian film director, producer and politician.

Personal life 
Haripriya was born on 1 June 1979 in Guwahati to Jiten Chakravarty and Bijoya Chakravarty. Her mother, Bijoya Chakravarty is ex-Member of Parliament of Bharatiya Janata Party from Gauhati. Haripriya holds Master of Arts in Sociology from New Delhi's Jamia Millia Islamia, Diploma in Film and Television from Noida's Asian Academy of Film & Television and Jyotish Acharya from New Delhi's Bharatiya Vidya Bhavan.

Career

Film 
Haripriya is associated with Assamese cinema. She has directed few Assamese movies. Her film Kadamtole Krishna Nache has received the Best Assamese Film in 53rd National Film Awards.

Political 
Haripriya is also a Bharatiya Janata Party politician. She was elected in Assam Legislative Assembly election in 2016 from Hajo.

Public image
Haripriya has suggested that cow urine and cow dung could be used against the coronavirus. She stated that, "Cow dung has many benefits. I think it can kill the coronavirus. Cow urine can also be useful." She has also suggested that cancer can be cured with cow dung and cow urine.

Filmography

Direction

References 

1979 births
Living people
Bharatiya Janata Party politicians from Assam
Assam MLAs 2016–2021
21st-century Indian women politicians
21st-century Indian politicians
Politicians from Guwahati
People from Jorhat district
Assamese-language film directors
Women members of the Assam Legislative Assembly
Assam MLAs 2021–2026
COVID-19 pandemic in India